Hosszúpatak is the Hungarian name for two villages in Romania:

 Tăuni village, Valea Lungă Commune, Alba County
 Valea Lungă village, Dârlos Commune, Sibiu County